Maria Adelsheim-Popovic (1822-1875), was a Serbian stage actor.  She belonged to the elite of the pioneer generation of actors at the Croatian National Theatre in Zagreb (1860) as well as of the Serbian National Theatre (1866).

She was born in Slovakia. She made her debut in a German language theater in 1846. She played a pioneer role in the Serbian language theater. She was referred to as one of the best actors of his time in Serbia, and as a member of the pioneer generation of the Serbian national theater educated several later Serbian star actors, notably Pera Dobrinović.

References 

 Српска породична енциклопедија. Књ. 1, А-Ар. Београд: Народна књига - Алфа, Политика. 2006. .(COBISS.SR 129480460)

1822 births
1875 deaths
19th-century Serbian actors
Serbian stage actresses
19th-century actresses
19th-century Serbian women